A governorate, gubernia, province, or government (also romanized), was a major and principal administrative subdivision of the Russian Empire. After the Bolshevik Revolution in 1917, governorates remained as subdivisions in Belarus, Russia, Ukraine, and in the Soviet Union from its formation until 1929. The term is also translated as government, governorate, or province. A governorate was headed by a governor (gubernator), a word borrowed from Latin , in turn from Greek .

Selected governorates were united under an assigned governor general such as the Grand Duchy of Finland, Congress Poland, Russian Turkestan and others. There also were military governors such as Kronstadt, Vladivostok and others. Aside from governorates, other types of divisions were oblasts (region) and okrugs (district).

First reform

This subdivision type was created by the edict (ukase) of Peter the Great on December 18, 1708 "On the establishment of the gubernias and cities assigned to them", which divided Russia into eight governorates.

Second reform
In 1719, governorates were further subdivided into provinces.  Later the number of governorates was increased to 23.

Changes from 1775: Namestnichestvo (Vice royalty)

By the reform of 1775, subdivision into governorates and further into uezds, was based on population size, and the term guberniya was replaced by the synonym of Russian origin: , sometimes translated as "viceroyalty". The term guberniya, however, still remained in use. Correspondingly,  the term "governorate general" was in use to refer to the actual territory being governed. The office of governor general had more administrative power and was in a higher position than the previous office of governor. Sometimes a governor general ruled several governorates.

By the ukase of the Russian Senate of December 31, 1796, the office of governorate general was demoted to the previous level of governorate, and Russia was again divided into governorates, which were subdivided into uezds, further subdivided into volosts; nevertheless several governorates general made from several governorates existed until the Russian Revolution of 1917.

Governorates in Poland and Finland 

The governorate system was also applied to subdivisions of the Kingdom of Poland ("Russian Poland") and the Grand Duchy of Finland.

Governorates in Ukraine 

The Russian Empire had acquired much of the territory inhabited by Ukrainians by the early 19th century, which was organized into nine Ukrainian governorates: Chernigov (Chernihiv in Ukrainian), Yekaterinoslav (Katerynoslav), Kiev (Kyiv), Kharkov (Kharkiv), Kherson, Podolia (Podillia), Poltava, Volhynia (Volyn), and the mainland part of Taurida (or Tavriia, without the Crimean peninsula). Additional lands annexed from Poland in 1815 were organized into the Kholm governorate in 1912.

After the events of 1917, which saw Ukraine attempt to secede from the Russian SFSR, these governorates became subdivisions of the Ukrainian People's Republic, which also annexed Ukrainian-inhabited parts of Mahilioŭ, Kursk, Voronezh, and Minsk governorates in 1918. By the end of the Soviet-Ukrainian war in 1920, the Russians had made them part of the Ukrainian SSR. Soviet Ukraine was reorganized into twelve governorates, which were reduced to nine in 1922 upon the Soviet Union's founding, and then replaced with okruhas in 1925.

Post-revolutionary changes
After the February Revolution, the Russian Provisional Government renamed governors into governorate commissars. The October Revolution left the subdivision in place, but the governing apparatus was replaced by governorate soviets.

Actual subdivisions of the Soviet Union into particular territorial units was subject to numerous changes, especially during the 1918–1929 period. Because of the Soviet Union's electrification program under the GOELRO plan, Ivan Alexandrov directed the Regionalisation Commission of Gosplan to divide the Soviet union into thirteen European and eight Asiatic oblasts, using rational economic planning rather than "the vestiges of lost sovereign rights". Eventually, in 1929, the subdivision was replaced by the notions of oblast, okrug, and raion. Oblast as a unit was used even before the revolution, although unlike governorates it designated remote areas that usually incorporated huge swaths of land.

In post-Soviet states such as Russia and Ukraine, the term Guberniya is considered obsolete, yet the word gubernator was reinstated and is used when referring to a governor of an oblast or a krai.

Other uses 
There is another meaning of the word as it denoted a type of estate in Lithuania of the until 1917.

See also
 History of the administrative division of Russia
 List of governorates of the Russian Empire
 Governorate-General (Russian Empire)]

References

External links
  Ignatov, V.G. "History of state administration of Russia" (История государственного управления России) 
  Иванов В. В. Глава субъекта Российской Федерации. История губернаторов. Том I. История. Книга I. — М., 2019. — 600 с.
  Иванов В. В. Глава субъекта Российской Федерации. История губернаторов. Том I. История. Книга II. — М., 2019. — 624 с.

Russia
 
 
Local government in the Russian Empire
Types of administrative division